The National College Baseball Hall of Fame is an institution operated by the College Baseball Foundation serving as the central point for the study of the history of college baseball in the United States.  In partnership with the Southwest Collection/Special Collections Library located on the campus of Texas Tech University in Lubbock, Texas, the Hall of Fame inducts former collegiate players and coaches who have met selection criteria of distinction.

History
The College Baseball Foundation was formed in 2004 as a non-profit organization, with the dual aims of continuing the Brooks Wallace Award and creating a national college baseball hall of fame. The inaugural Wallace Award was bestowed in 2004, but the inaugural Hall of Fame induction class was not chosen until 2006. As of 2006, organizers hoped to have a permanent building constructed by 2008.  As of January 2013, the Foundation had raised approximately $7 million of the $13 million goal, after receiving a $5 million grant from the Moody Foundation. A ceremonial groundbreaking was held in June 2015 in Lubbock. In April 2017, the Foundation announced that it would no longer pursue constructing a museum in Lubbock.

Inductees
The 2006 inaugural class for the National College Baseball Hall of Fame consisted of five former coaches and five former players. Annually thereafter, through 2016, additional players and coaches were enshrined. In May 2017, organizers cancelled that year's annual “Night of Champions” induction ceremony.

Players

Head coaches

Veteran players (pre-1947 era)

Executives

Umpires

Induction

Criteria
Selection criteria and categorization has changed over time.

The original criteria, established in 2006, allow for recognition of:

 Coaches — eligible after ending their active collegiate career (and not actively coaching a professional baseball team) who have achieved 300 career wins or won at least 65% of their games.
 Players — eligible five years after their final collegiate season (and not actively playing professional baseball) who competed for at least one year at a four-year institution, and made an All American (post-1947) or All League (pre-1947) team.
 Teams — of "great achievement" at a four-year institution.

The top ten voter-getters were selected for induction to the Hall of Fame. Veteran and Historical Committees could nominate individuals from the pre-1947 era, however there was no differentiation in how approved nominees were recognized.

In 2009, a small school category was added, "featuring players and coaches from NAIA, NCAA Divisions II and III, and two-year colleges."

In 2011, a Legends and Pioneers Committee was created, "...designed to provide recognition to black pioneers in college baseball and to honor outstanding players and coaches whose careers at Historically Black Colleges and Universities began prior to 1975." Also, nominees would now be required to reach a threshold of votes, rather than automatically inducting the top ten vote-getters.

In 2012, voting was revised with five ballot categories: Vintage Era (pre-1964) players and coaches, small school players, small school coaches, 1964–2001 players, and NCAA Division I coaches.

Ceremony
The induction ceremony for the inaugural class occurred on July 4, 2006. The “Night of Champions” was usually held the day after the Brooks Wallace Award winner was announced; the most recent induction ceremony was held in 2016.

See also

Baseball awards#U.S. college baseball
Helms Athletic Foundation
List of college baseball awards
List of museums in West Texas

References

Further reading

External links
 

College baseball in the United States
College baseball trophies and awards in the United States
Baseball museums and halls of fame
Baseball
Texas Tech University
Sports museums in Texas
Museums in Lubbock, Texas
Awards established in 2006
2006 establishments in Texas
Baseball in Lubbock, Texas
Baseball venues in Texas
Sports venues in Lubbock, Texas
College sports halls of fame in the United States